Cirolana mercuryi is a species of isopod found on coral reefs off Bawe Island, (Zanzibar, Tanzania) in East Africa and named for Freddie Mercury, "arguably Zanzibar's most famous popular musician and singer".

See also
List of organisms named after famous people (born 1900–1949)

References

Cymothoida
Freddie Mercury
Crustaceans described in 2004